The Vindhyachal Express is an express train service offered by West Central Railways. The name 'Vindhyachal' signifies the Vindhyachal hill valley of Madhya Pradesh state.

Number
The number allotted for the train is :

11271 – Itarsi to Bhopal
11272 – Bhopal to Itarsi

Route and halts

It runs via Bina–Katni rail route and Jabalpur Junction making a semi-circle while traveling through the half portion of Madhya Pradesh. This train changes both locomotive and direction of locomotive at Katni station.

The important halts of this train are :

 Bhopal Junction
 Sanchi
 Vidisha
 Gulabganj
 Ganj Basoda
 Mandi Bamora
 Bina Junction
 
 Saugor
 
 Damoh
 Bandakpur
 Salaia
 New Katni Junction
 Sihora Road
 
 
 Bheraghat
 Shridham
 Narsinghpur
 Kareli
 Gadarwara railway station
 Sohagpur
 ITARSI JN.

Loco link
This train hauled by Itarsi-based WAP-4 locomotive end to end.

Coach composition
Normally the train consists of 14 coaches as follows:
 4 Sleeper
 8 General
 2 Luggage cum Parcel

References
 Express
 

Transport in Bhopal
Named passenger trains of India
Railway services introduced in 1964
Railway services introduced in 2006
Rail transport in Madhya Pradesh
Express trains in India